This is a list of mayors of Kenora, Ontario.

Town of Rat Portage
William LeBaron Baker (1883)
Walter Oliver (1884 - 1885)
Thaddeus Anthony Gadbois (1886)
James Nelson McCracken (1887 - 1888)
William Young (1889 - 1891)
Archibald Campbell (1892)
James Malcolm Savage (1893 - 1894)
George Barnes (1895 - 1896)
William Young (1897)
William McCarthy (1899 - 1900)
Sir Douglas Colin Cameron (1901 - 1903)
Algernon Sydney Horswill (1904 - 1905)

Town of Kenora
Angus Carmichael (1906)
Charles W. Belyea (1907)
Harding Rideout (1908 - 1910)	
D. H. Currie (1911)
John Thomas Brett (1912 - 1914)
Joseph Earngey (1915 - 1918)
George A. Toole (1919 - 1923)
John Brenchley (1924 - 1925)
Ashton Thomas Fife (1926 - 1928)
Earl Hutchinson (1928 - 1929)
W. S. Carruthers (1930 - 1933)
Thomas McClellan (1934 - 1938)
J. P. Williams (1939 - 1942)
A. G. Holland (1943 - 1946)
W. G. Jay (1947 - June 1948)
George Raymond Carmichael (1948 - 1951)
A. R. Pitt (1952 - 1953)
J. V. Fregeau (1954 - Feb 1957)
P. Ratuski (Mar 1957 - 1959)
C. A. Bergman (1960 - 1963)
W. E. Norton (1964 - 1965)
E. L. Carter (1966 - 1971)
James Davidson (1971 - 1974)
William Tomashowski (1975 - 1976)
Udo Romstedt (1977 - 1980)
Kelvin Winkler (1980 - 1994)
Joyce Chevrier (1994 - 1997)
Kelvin Winkler (1997 - 2000)

City of Kenora
Dave Canfield (2000 - 2006)
Len Compton (December 1, 2006 - November 30, 2010)
Dave Canfield (December 1, 2010 - November 30, 2018)
Dan Reynard (December 1, 2018 - present)
Andrew Poirier (2022, elect)

References

Kenora